The 1974–75 season was Paris Saint-Germain's 5th season in existence. PSG mainly played their home league games at the Parc des Princes in Paris, but once at the Stade Yves-du-Manoir in Colombes as well, registering an average attendance of 17,456 spectators per match. The Parisians also played one Coupe de France home game at the Stade de Paris in Saint-Ouen-sur-Seine. The club was presided by Daniel Hechter and the team was coached by Robert Vicot. Jean-Pierre Dogliani was the team captain.

Summary

In an ironic turn of events, Paris FC were relegated to Division 2 at the same time as Paris Saint-Germain moved up to the top flight in 1974, leaving their home stadium, the Parc des Princes, in the hands of their estranged Parisian brothers. Since then, the Parc has been the home of PSG. Before that, PSG had been playing at several grounds including the Stade Municipal Georges Lefèvre, the Stade Jean-Bouin, the Stade Bauer, the Stade Yves-du-Manoir and even the Parc a few times despite the reluctance of Paris FC.

With promotion to Division 1 also came a change of command. Daniel Hechter, then chairman of the management committee, took over as club president in June 1974 following the resignation of Henri Patrelle. He named Francis Borelli as vice-president. Hechter immediately opened his checkbook once again, signing Algerian virtuoso Mustapha Dahleb from Sedan for a then French transfer record 1.3 million francs in July 1974. In spite of the great partnership created by Dahleb and fellow attacker François M'Pelé (50 goals between them), PSG were still far from challenging for the league title in 1974–75, finishing in a lowly 15th place.

The club's French Cup performance was the high point of the season. PSG brushed aside Sochaux 5–0 on aggregate in the last 16 to set up an epic duel with Marseille in the quarterfinals. Played amidst a hostile atmosphere, the Red and Blues visited the Stade Vélodrome as massive underdogs. OM comfortably led by two goals until, out of the blue, M'Pelé scored twice to revive PSG's hopes of qualification (2–2). Angered by the result, Marseille fans attacked the PSG team bus after the final whistle. M'Pelé believes this cup game is the true origin of the rivalry between both clubs. In the second leg, PSG won 2–0 and qualified for the semifinals, a first for a Parisian club since Stade Français in 1965, before narrowly bowing out to Lens.

Players

As of the 1974–75 season.

Squad

Transfers

As of the 1974–75 season.

Arrivals

Departures

Kits

French radio RTL was the shirt sponsor. French sportswear brand Le Coq Sportif was the kit manufacturer.

Friendly tournaments

Tournoi de Paris

Competitions

Overview

Division 1

League table

Results by round

Matches

Coupe de France

Round of 64

Round of 32

Round of 16

Quarter-finals

Semi-finals

Statistics

As of the 1974–75 season.

Appearances and goals

|-
!colspan="16" style="background:#dcdcdc; text-align:center"|Goalkeepers

|-
!colspan="16" style="background:#dcdcdc; text-align:center"|Defenders

|-
!colspan="16" style="background:#dcdcdc; text-align:center"|Midfielders

|-
!colspan="16" style="background:#dcdcdc; text-align:center"|Forwards

|-

References

External links

Official websites
PSG.FR - Site officiel du Paris Saint-Germain
Paris Saint-Germain - Ligue 1 
Paris Saint-Germain - UEFA.com

Paris Saint-Germain F.C. seasons
Association football clubs 1974–75 season
French football clubs 1974–75 season